Pokrovsk is the name of several inhabited localities in Russia.

Modern localities
Urban localities
Pokrovsk, Sakha Republic, a town under republic jurisdiction in Khangalassky District of the Sakha Republic

Rural localities
Pokrovsk, Kaluga Oblast, a selo in Kozelsky District of Kaluga Oblast
Pokrovsk, Mari El Republic, a village in Mikhaylovsky Rural Okrug of Sovetsky District of the Mari El Republic
Pokrovsk, Republic of Mordovia, a selo in Pokrovsky Selsoviet of Kovylkinsky District of the Republic of Mordovia

Historical names
Pokrovsk, name of the city of Engels in Saratov Oblast between 1914 and 1931

See also
Pokrovsky (disambiguation)